Angelos Pournos (born 21 June 1992) is a Greek footballer who plays for Panelefsiniakos as a defensive midfielder.

Career
Pournos began playing football with AEK Athens U20. He also played for Enosis Aspropyrgos, VV De Meern, Iraklis Psachna, Vyzas, Panionios G.S.S., Nea Salamina and Karmiotissa.
In July 2014 Pournos signed for Paniliakos.

References

External links
 
 

1992 births
Living people
Footballers from Athens
Greek footballers
Vyzas F.C. players
Panionios F.C. players
Nea Salamis Famagusta FC players
Paniliakos F.C. players
A.P.S. Zakynthos players
Greek expatriate footballers
Greek expatriate sportspeople in Cyprus
Expatriate footballers in Cyprus
Karmiotissa FC players
Association football midfielders
Panelefsiniakos F.C. players
Cypriot Second Division players